The Homecoming (literally: Thirteen Strokes) is a Singaporean Chinese TV drama series telecast on MediaCorp TV Channel 8. It made its debut on 3 April 2007 and ended its run on 30 April 2007. The series ran for a total of 20 episodes.

Cast

Main cast
Li Nanxing as Dong Weihong
Constance Song as Sessy
Rayson Tan as Chen Hanyuan

Supporting cast
Zheng Geping as Huang Zhenfa
Vivian Lai as Qianyi
Brandon Wong as Lai Guoqiang
Ye Shipin as Ah Long Jiu
Ong Ai Leng as Sandy

Synopsis
Dong Weihong returns to Singapore from the US with his nine-year-old son, Ryan. He catches up with his old buddies Chen Hanyuan, Lai Quoqiang and Huang Zhenfa to reminisce their past friendships. Weihong, who is currently unemployed, helps out in Zhenfa's automobile business while Hanyuan is a successful lawyer and Guoqiang earns a living by being a professional "scapegoat" for criminals. Before long, old feelings of betrayal start brewing among them when they recall their past.

The four friends were convicted of arson and sentenced to imprisonment and caning several years ago. Weihong, Guoqiang and Zhenfa each received three strokes of the cane while Hanyuan received four strokes. He was the one who instigated his friends to commit arson and that effectively made him the mastermind. However, no one else will know the truth unless one of his three friends have betrayed him during the investigation. Hanyuan is deeply traumatised by the experience and vowed to find out who betrayed him. In order to take his revenge, Hanyuan resorts to unscrupulous means and causes harm to those around him.

A complex love relationship develops between Hanyuan, Sessy, Weihong and Qianyi. Qianyi is a childhood friend of Weihong and has been in love with him for a long time but Weihong does not reciprocate. Hanyuan and Sessy are married and Weihong's return threatens their marriage as Sessy still has some feelings for Weihong. As his mind slowly deranges, Hanyuan begins to suspect his wife and Weihong and believes that Weihong is the one who betrayed him.

Awards & Nominations
The other dramas that are nominated for Best Drama are Like Father, Like Daughter 宝贝父女兵, Mars vs Venus 幸福双人床, Metamorphosis 破茧而出 and The Peak 最高点.
The other dramas that are nominated for Best Theme Song are Jeff Wang 王建复 — The Peak 最高点 (《并肩的方向》)
A-do 阿杜 — Kinship 手足 (《逃离》)
Chew Sin Huey 石欣卉 — The Greatest Love of All 爱.特别的你 (《多一点爱》)
Honour and Passion 宝家卫国

Star Awards 2007

Viewership Ratings

External links
Official Website (Via Wayback Machine)

Singapore Chinese dramas
2007 Singaporean television series debuts
2007 Singaporean television series endings
Channel 8 (Singapore) original programming